Adi Stein is a retired Israeli football midfielder and a football coach. Stein had played in the Israeli First League for ASA Tel Aviv, as well as in the NCAA with the West Texas A&M Buffaloes. She had played in the Champions League with Maccabi Haifa and ASA Tel Aviv. and was a member of the Israeli national team; she made her debut in the 2007 World Cup qualifying against Wales.

Club career
Stein started playing with the boys' team of F.C. Neve Yosef, before moving to play with Maccabi Haifa's women team at the age of 15. Stein played for Maccabi Haifa until the club had folded, winning the league and cup.

After Maccabi Haifa had folded, Stein moved to ASA Tel Aviv University, where she had played until 2012. Between 2006 and 2009, Stein attended West Texas A&M University, and played for the university's soccer team, while still playing for ASA Tel Aviv a few matches in each season. In December 2009 Stein returned to Israel and played in ASA Tel Aviv for the next four seasons, winning the Israeli championship in each season, as well as two cups. At the end of the 2012–13 season Stein retired from active football and moved to a coaching career, coaching girls' teams in Petah Tikva and Herzliya

International career
Stein made her international debut for Israel women's national football team in 2006 against Wales and played a total of 11 matches for the national team. Stein had also played for the U-19 national team, making a total of 12 appearances and scoring one goals, between 2001 and 2005.

Honours
Championships (5):
 2001–02 (with Maccabi Haifa), 2010–11, 2011–12, 2012–13, 2012–13 (with ASA Tel Aviv University).
Cup (3):
 2001–02 (with Maccabi Haifa), 2010–11, 2011–12 (with ASA Tel Aviv University).

References

External links

1986 births
Living people
Israeli women's footballers
Israel women's international footballers
Expatriate women's soccer players in the United States
Maccabi Haifa F.C. (women) players
ASA Tel Aviv University players
Women's association football midfielders
Israeli Jews
Jewish sportspeople
Israeli expatriate women's footballers
Israeli expatriate sportspeople in the United States
West Texas A&M Lady Buffs soccer players